William or Bill Bateman may refer to:
William Bateman (bishop) ( 1298–1355), medieval bishop of Norwich
William Bateman, 1st Viscount Bateman (1695–1744), British politician
William H. Bateman, 19th-century Sandy Hook pilot boat
Bill Bateman (cricketer) (1866–1935), Australian cricketer and businessman
Bill Bateman (drummer) (born 1951), American drummer

See also
William Bateman-Hanbury (disambiguation)